Andrew O'Connor (born 1978) is an Australian novelist.

Life

Born in Warragul, Victoria, he studied arts at the University of Melbourne before travelling and working in central and northern Australia. Following this, he lived and worked in Tokyo and Nagano, Japan. He presently lives in Warragul, Australia.

Awards and nominations

 2005 — The Australian/Vogel Literary Award for Tuvalu
 2007 — Commonwealth Writers' Prize (South East Asia and South Pacific Region, Best First Book) for Tuvalu
 2008 — Longlisted in the International Dublin Literary Award for Tuvalu

Bibliography
Tuvalu (2006)

External links
 

1978 births
Australian male novelists
Living people
People from Warragul
Writers from Victoria (Australia)
University of Melbourne alumni